Silicon Border Holding Company, LLC is a commercial  development site designed to produce semi-conductors for consumers in North America. The site is located in Mexicali, Baja California, along the western border of the United States of America and Mexico. The site began manufacturing semiconductors between 2004-2005 with the intention of competing with the global market. Silicon Border is providing Mexico with an infrastructure that enables high-tech companies anywhere in the world to move manufacturing operations to the country and exploit its competitive advantages such as geographical location, human capital, research, legal and tax benefits, intellectual property, international treaties, and logistics provided by the country for manufacturing high technology products while allowing research to develop processes, design, fabrication and testing able to compete with Asian operations and costs. The infrastructure build-out, financed by ING Clarion, consists of potable water plant and distribution, fiber optic telephone and data cable, power substations, and waste treatment facilities. Silicon Border not only provides manufacturing space to companies creating "green" products, but does so in an environmentally conscious manner.

The Autonomous University of Baja California and CETYS, a private not-for-profit university located in Mexicali, have started new programs such as Aerospace Engineering, Semiconductors and Microelectronics Engineering, Renewable Energy Engineering, Bioengineering, History and Sociology to prepare the required human capital for potential high-tech firms.

California's Governor Arnold Schwarzenegger promoted cooperation with the project and has encouraged economic partnerships with Silicon Border in his radio addresses. At the beginning of 2006, the California governor created the "California/Baja Silicon Border Work Group," run by deputy secretary of the California Business, Transportation, and Housing Agency, Yolanda Benson. State officials promised to hasten the roadways needed to link up with those being built for Silicon Border in Mexico.

Silicon Border is the only site in North America with abundant and inexpensive electrical power, natural gas and potable water, as well as a large labor pool of high skilled and motivated individuals. The area is supplied with water from the Colorado River and a major electrical sub-station supplied by three separate power plants. Infrastructure improvements associated with the proposed project include a new highway (under construction) and an additional border crossing. Silicon Border estimates that in ten years following the onset of development, the Silicon Border Science Park could generate 100,000 jobs, both within Mexico and the U.S.

See also
 Silicon Valley
 Silicon Wadi

References

Mexicali
Imperial County, California
Information technology places